Jeff Klaparda (born November 7, 1963) is a former professional tennis player from the United States.

Biography
Klaparda, who is Jewish, won a gold medal at the 1981 Maccabiah Games in Israel, in the mixed doubles with Andrea Leand.

He went to UCLA in the early 1980s and was an All-American player on the tennis team. In the 1984 NCAA Division I Tennis Championships he was captain of the UCLA side that won the Championship and he also made the semi-finals of the singles. He won the 1984 USTA National Amateur Clay Courts title.

At a Grand Prix tournament in Cleveland in 1984, Klaparda had an upset win over top 20 player Bill Scanlon, before exiting in the semi-finals. Soon after he qualified for the main draw in the 1984 US Open and beat countryman John Hayes in the first round, then lost a four-set second round match to eight seed Aaron Krickstein. It was his only Grand Slam appearances in singles but he competed in several doubles draws with a best performance coming at the 1987 Wimbledon Championships, when he and partner Lloyd Bourne had a win over the sixth seeds Peter Fleming and Gary Donnelly, en route to the third round. It was with Bourne that he won his only Grand Prix title, the doubles at the 1987 Rye Brook Open.

Grand Prix career finals

Doubles: 1 (1–0)

Challenger titles

Doubles: (3)

See also

List of select Jewish tennis players

References

External links
 
 

1963 births
Living people
American male tennis players
Jewish tennis players
Jewish American sportspeople
Maccabiah Games medalists in tennis
Maccabiah Games gold medalists for the United States
Competitors at the 1981 Maccabiah Games
UCLA Bruins men's tennis players
Tennis players from Los Angeles
21st-century American Jews